Yash Kothari (born 6 October 1995) is an Indian cricketer. He made his List A debut for Rajasthan in the 2017–18 Vijay Hazare Trophy on 8 February 2018. He made his first-class debut on 3 January 2020, for Rajasthan in the 2019–20 Ranji Trophy. He made his Twenty20 debut on 4 November 2021, for Rajasthan in the 2021–22 Syed Mushtaq Ali Trophy. He made his Twenty20 debut on 8 November 2021, for Rajasthan in the 2021–22 Syed Mushtaq Ali Trophy.

References

External links
 

1995 births
Living people
Indian cricketers
Place of birth missing (living people)
Rajasthan cricketers